Christiane Delyne (3 September 1902 – 17 April 1966) was an American-born French actress.

Delyne was born in Philadelphia, Pennsylvania, as Evelyn Meyer and died in Paris in 1966.

Selected filmography
 Luck (1931)
 A Father Without Knowing It (1932)
 He Is Charming (1932)
 Cognasse (1932)
 The Ironmaster (1933)
 High and Low (1933)
 Paprika (1933)
 Les gaietés du palace (1936)
 A Hen on a Wall (1936)
 Sacré Léonce (1936)
 The House Opposite (1937)

External links

1902 births
1966 deaths
French film actresses
Actresses from Philadelphia
American emigrants to France
Naturalized citizens of France
20th-century French actresses
20th-century American women
20th-century American people